SS Empire Javelin was an Infantry Landing Ship or "LSI (Large)" in service with the UK in the latter part of the Second World War.  Launched on 25 October 1943, she was a United States Maritime Commission C1-S-AY1 subtype, one of thirteen similar ships built by Consolidated Steel Corporation.

SS Empire Javelin served as a troop ship in Operation Overlord, including "D-Day" on 6 June 1944. She was lost on 28 December 1944 while en convoy to France with 1,483 troops aboard somewhere around the midpoint between Southampton, England, and Le Havre, France.

History

Construction and operation
SS Empire Javelin was built by Consolidated Steel Corporation, Wilmington, California as the Cape Lobos, and transferred under the terms of lend lease on completion in January 1944. She was bareboat chartered by the War Shipping Administration to the Ministry of War Transport and managed by Blue Star Line.

D-Day
The ship sailed from Portland Harbour anchorage on 5 June 1944, destined for Dog Green Omaha Beach, Normandy, after embarking troops of the 1st Battalion 116th Infantry regiment of US 29th Division by landing craft from Weymouth, Dorset. Most notably, the ship carried members of Company A, 116th Infantry, who were from Bedford, Virginia. Bedford is the home of the United States' National D-Day Memorial. 551st Landing Craft Assault (LCA) Flotilla crewed by Royal Navy Volunteer Reserve (RNVR) of Combined Operations was based aboard Empire Javelin on D-Day. Six of the eighteen LCAs of 551st LCA Flotilla were lost on D-Day, with the remainder being severely damaged.

Loss

SS Empire Javelin embarked 1,483 US servicemen at Southampton for Le Havre, France on 28 December 1944. She was in convoy with USS LST-325 and escorted by the Free French frigate L'Escarmouche. The L'Escarmouche was called alongside once the extent of the damage had been assessed, and for approximately an hour the men on board the Empire Javelin jumped from the ship. HMS Hargood (K582) arrived to assist, standing off nearby on submarine watch. Two minutes after the last man jumped off, there was a large explosion and the ship began settling by the stern. About 10 minutes later she was completely submerged.

Another U-boat, was active in the area on the same day, and was sunk on the next day south of Weymouth. There is no definitive proof of what sank the Empire Javelin; it has also been proposed it struck a mine.

Notes

References

Further reading
 

 

1944 ships
Empire ships
Maritime incidents in December 1944
Ministry of War Transport ships
Ships built in Los Angeles
Ships of the Blue Star Line
Ships sunk by German submarines in World War II
Steamships of the United Kingdom
Steamships of the United States
Troop ships of the United Kingdom
Type C1-S ships
World War II merchant ships of the United States
World War II shipwrecks in the English Channel